Rafael Lang (born November 23rd, 1910, died March 1st, 2002 in Castellon, Spain) was an Argentine boxer. He competed in the men's light heavyweight event at the 1932 Summer Olympics.

References

1910 births
Year of death missing
Argentine male boxers
Olympic boxers of Argentina
Boxers at the 1932 Summer Olympics
Sportspeople from Bucharest
Light-heavyweight boxers